Kim Kang-hoon (Korean: 김강훈; born 2009) is a South Korean child actor. He is known for his roles in the television series Pride and Prejudice (2014), Criminal Minds (2017), Mr. Sunshine (2018), When the Camellia Blooms (2019), and Racket Boys (2021). Currently, he is under exclusive contract with Awesome Entertainment.

Career
Kim made his debut in 2013, appearing in MBC Every 1 entertainment show Mom and Dad from Today. He gained recognition for his roles in Pride and Prejudice (2014), Criminal Minds (2017) and Mr. Sunshine (2018).

In 2019, Kim played a notable role in KBS2 drama When the Camellia Blooms as Kang Pil-gu – son of a single mother played by Gong Hyo-jin. The drama became second highest rated mini-series aired in 2019. For his performance, Kim won Best Young Actor Award at 2019 KBS Drama Awards and was nominated for the Best New Actor – Television at 56th Baeksang Arts Awards being one of the catogery's youngest nominees.

In 2020 Kim won Rookie Award in Variety Category at 2020 MBC Entertainment Awards for his appearances in King of Mask Singer,
Those Who Cross the Line and Omniscient Interfering View becoming the youngest recipient of the award.

In 2021 Kim starred in SBS drama Racket Boys as Lee Yong-tae: youngest member of badminton club, marking his first major role.

In February 2022, Kim signed an exclusive contract with Awesome Entertainment as his first agency since his debut.

In 2022, he appears in TVING series Dr. Park's Clinic and JTBC drama The Youngest Son of a Conglomerate.

Filmography

Film

Television series

Web series

Television shows

Hosting

Ambassadorship

Awards and nominations

Notes

References

External links
  
 
 
 

2009 births
Living people
21st-century South Korean male actors
South Korean male child actors
South Korean male television actors
South Korean male film actors
People from Cheongju